Dave du’Fort (also known as Hermien JD) is a British rock drummer who has played with Ian Hunter, Kevin Ayers, Mike Oldfield and Screaming Lord Sutch, and was a member of the new wave of British heavy metal bands E. F. Band, Angel Witch and Tytan. He is the brother of Denise Dufort, drummer with Girlschool.

Career 
His first band of note was The Scenery, formed in 1966 with Miller Anderson, and subsequently joined by Ian Hunter. In 1968 he rejoined Anderson in Paper Blitz Tissue, but left and was replaced by Bill Bruford. He subsequently toured as part of Ayers' backing band, The Whole World.

In 1979 he joined Pär Ericsson and Bengt Fischer, two former members of the progressive rock band Epizootic in their E. F. Band, but left before their first album. After a spell with Angel Witch, he and their bassist, Kevin Riddles, formed Tytan, in the autumn of 1981. Once again, he left before their first album was recorded.

He now records film music, under the name Hermien Jerian-du'Fort.

Selected discography 
 
 
 
 1189: Lionheart, The Third Crusade

References

External links
 
 March 2009 interview
 Metal Archives (has photo)

Sites featuring du'Fort's music
http://www.tower-of-london.com (Full original audio soundtrack throughout)
http://www.camelotintl.com 
http://www.londonatlarge.com

British rock drummers
British male drummers
Living people
Year of birth missing (living people)
Angel Witch members